Karel Urbánek (born 22 March 1941 in Bojkovice, Moravia) is a retired Czech politician, and the last Communist leader of Czechoslovakia.

Career
A former Bojkovice railway station manager, he replaced Miloš Jakeš as Secretary General of the Communist Party of Czechoslovakia after a swift election on 24 November 1989 in the wake of the Velvet Revolution. Four days later, he gave his approval to a constitutional amendment which stripped the Communist Party of its monopoly of power, which proved to be the only major decision of his tenure. However, Communist rule had effectively ended with Jakeš' resignation. He remained as party leader until 20 December 1989, when he was succeeded by Ladislav Adamec.

References

1941 births
Living people
People from Bojkovice
Czech communists
Leaders of the Communist Party of Czechoslovakia
People of the Velvet Revolution